Hamamelistes is a genus of true bugs belonging to the family Aphididae.

The species of this genus are found in Europe and Northern America.

Species:
 Hamamelistes betulinus (de Horváth, 1896)
 Hamamelistes cristafoliae (Monzen, 1954)
 Hamamelistes spinosus (Shimer, 1867) — Spiny Witch-Hazel Gall Aphid

References

Aphididae